Punk Lawyer or  Advocaat van de Hanen  is a 1996 Dutch film directed by Gerrit van Elst. The film is based on the novel Advocaat van de Hanen  by Dutch writer A.F.Th. van der Heijden.

Cast
Pierre Bokma	... 	Mr. Ernst Quispel
Margo Dames	... 	Zwanet
Jaap Spijkers	... 	Frank
Peter Oosthoek	... 	Quispel Sr.
Yoka Berretty	... 	Moeder Quispel
Roos Ouwehand	... 	Roxanne
Marcel Hensema	... 	Pixley
André Arend van de Noord	... 	Kraker Kiliaan Noppen
Johan Simons	... 	Vader Noppen
Beppie Melissen	... 	Moeder Noppen
Daniella Remmers	... 	Francine
Titus Muizelaar	... 	De Moei
Hans Kesting... 	Hanekroot
Hans Croiset	... 	Dr. Rollema
Hans Karsenbarg	... 	Officier van Justitie

External links 
 

Dutch drama films
1996 films
1990s Dutch-language films